Yellowroot is a common name for two plants native to Eastern North America. These plants contain the compound berberine, which gives the roots a yellow color, and have been employed in herbal medicine.

Yellowroot may refer to:

Hydrastis canadensis, also known as goldenseal
Xanthorhiza simplicissima